Imasiña (Aymara for "to hide", also spelled Himaciña) is a  mountain in the Cordillera Real in the Andes of Bolivia. It is located in the La Paz Department at the border of the Larecaja Province, Guanay Municipality, and the Los Andes Province, Pucarani Municipality. Imasiña lies northwest of Jisk'a Pata and northeast of Wari Umaña.

References 

Mountains of La Paz Department (Bolivia)